Matthias of Trakai or of Vilnius (ca. 1370 – 9 May 1453 in Vilnius) was a Lithuanian Roman Catholic clergyman, the first Bishop of Samogitia from its establishment in 1417 until 1422 and the fifth Bishop of Vilnius from 4 May 1422 until 9 May 1453 and an ex officio member of the Council of Lords.

Biography
Matthias graduated from Charles University in Prague with the Master's degree in liberal arts in 1408, and studied in the University of Siena afterwards. Serving as the dean of Trakai, the Grand Duchy of Lithuania, he participated in the Christianization of Samogitia and was a supporter of Vytautas' political aspirations and an active participant in his coronation matters. Matthias was nominated to the newly established post of Samogitian bishop by Vytautas the Great and was consecrated on 24 October 1417 in Trakai.

Matthias was a Samogitian and Lithuanian speaker. According to Jan Długosz, he was a Vilnian of Livonian German origin, while Vytautas has mentioned him being a Lithuanian. The bishop has conducted the marriage of the King of Poland and Grand Duke of Lithuania Jogaila to his last wife Sophia of Halshany in the city of Navahrudak in 1422; he became the bishop of the Diocese of Vilnius later that year. Matthias sent representatives to the Council of Basel and set up the Inquisition to combat the Hussites, founded many churches and strenuously defended the rights and privileges of the Lithuanians. Matthias took care that new Catholic priests would be fluent in the Lithuanian language. He performed Last Rites for the dying Vytautas on 27 October 1430.

References

Bishops of Vilnius
15th-century Roman Catholic bishops in Lithuania
1453 deaths
Charles University alumni
University of Siena alumni
Year of birth uncertain